Jim Ned Consolidated Independent School District is a school district based in Tuscola, Texas (USA). The district serves approximately 1,000 students in southeastern Taylor County, including the towns of Tuscola, Buffalo Gap and Lawn. A small portion of northeastern Runnels County lies within the district. The district is named after the Jim Ned Creek, which runs through all three towns. The creek is named after Jim Ned, who was an Indian cavalry scout for the US Army.

Colt McCoy, the former starting quarterback for the Texas Longhorns who now plays for the NFL's Arizona Cardinals, graduated from the district's Jim Ned High School.

In 2009, the school district was rated "recognized" by the Texas Education Agency.

Schools
Jim Ned High School (Grades 9–12)
Jim Ned Middle School (Grades 6–8)
Jim Ned Elementary School – Buffalo Gap Campus (Grades K-5)
Jim Ned Elementary School – Lawn Campus (Grades PreK-5)
2006 National Blue Ribbon School

References

External links
Jim Ned CISD

School districts in Taylor County, Texas
School districts in Runnels County, Texas